The 2017 Oregon State Beavers baseball team represents Oregon State University in the 2017 NCAA Division I baseball season.  The Beavers play their home games at Goss Stadium at Coleman Field and are members of the Pac-12 Conference.  The team was coached by Pat Casey in his 23rd season at Oregon State.  The Beavers finished the regular season with the best record in the history of the program at 49-4, and set the Pac-12 record for conference victories in a season with 27.  They were awarded the #1 overall national seed in the NCAA baseball tournament for the second time in team history (2014).

Schedule and results

Rankings

References

Oregon State Beavers baseball seasons
Oregon State
2017 in sports in Oregon
Oregon State
College World Series seasons
Pac-12 Conference baseball champion seasons